Stephen Jolin, better known as Anodajay, is a rapper from Rouyn-Noranda, Quebec in Canada. He is best known for his cover of the Quebec classic renamed Le beat à Ti-bi , in duet with Raôul Duguay.

Biography 
Anodajay first encountered hip hop at the age of twelve, and from the age of sixteen became more involved in it, along with his other main interest basketball. He worked as a physical education teacher at D'Iberville school for several years before pursuing music as a full-time career. He released his first album Premier VII in 2003, but success came in 2006 with his second album Septentrion, which contained a cover of the Quebec classic renamed Le beat à Ti-bi, in duet with Raôul Duguay. His third album ET7ERA, was released in 2010.

Personal life 
He resides in Abitibi, Quebec.

Discography

Albums 
2003: Premier VII
2006: Septentrion
2010: ET7ERA

EPs 
2005: Le 7 secondes...

Singles 
2011: "Jamais su"
2011: "Mon neighborwood"

As Executive Producer

References

External links
Official website

1977 births
Living people
People from Rouyn-Noranda
Canadian male rappers
21st-century Canadian rappers
Musicians from Quebec
French Quebecers
21st-century Canadian male musicians